Nationality words link to articles with information on the nation's poetry or literature (for instance, Irish or France).

Events

Works published
 Matthew Concanen, editor, Miscellaneous Poems, Original and Translated
 Eliza Haywood, Poems on Several Occasions, published anonymously, issued in Volume 4 of a set of Works, likely published together
 Lady Mary Wortley Montagu, "Epistle from Mrs. Yonge to her Husband"
 Allan Ramsay
 Editor, The Ever Green: Being a collection of Scots poems, in two volumes, the only two of the planned four volumes to be published; Scotland
 Health
 Co-author and editor, The Tea-Table Miscellany, a collection of Scots songs, in Scots and English, composed or amended by Ramsay and his friends, the first of four volumes, with the last volume published in 1737
 Elizabeth Tollet, Poems on Several Occasions, published anonymously
 William Warburton, Miscellaneous Translations, in Prose and Verse
 Leonard Welsted, Epistles, Odes &c., Written on Several Subjects

Births
Death years link to the corresponding "[year] in poetry" article:
 January 12 – Frances Brooke, née Moore (died 1789), English novelist, poet, essayist, playwright and translator
 February 12 – William Mason (died 1797), English poet, editor and gardener
 February 25 – Karl Wilhelm Ramler (died 1798), German poet
 March 20 – Duncan Ban MacIntyre (died 1812), Scottish Gaelic poet
 May 18 – Magtymguly Pyragy (died c. 1807), Turkmen spiritual leader and poet
 July 2 – Friedrich Gottlieb Klopstock (died 1803), German poet
 August 28 – Diamante Medaglia Faini (died 1770), Italian poet
 August 30 – Agatha Lovisa de la Myle (died 1787), Baltic-German and Latvian poet
 October 31 – Christopher Anstey (died 1805), English writer and poet
 Friedrich Carl Casimir von Creuz (died 1770), German
 Frances Greville (died 1789), Irish poet
 Henriette Louise von Hayn (died 1782), German
 Johann Franz von Palthen (died 1804), German

Deaths
Birth years link to the corresponding "[year] in poetry" article:
 February 7 – Hanabusa Itchō (born 1652), Japanese painter, calligrapher and haiku poet
 February 12 – Elkanah Settle (born 1648), English poet and playwright
 August 15 – Manko 万乎| (birth year unknown), Japanese middle Edo period poet and wealthy merchant; apprentice of Matsuo Bashō; has poems in Sarumino, Sumidawara and Zoku-sarumino

See also

 Poetry
 List of years in poetry
 List of years in literature
 18th century in poetry
 18th century in literature
 Augustan poetry
 Scriblerus Club

Notes

 "A Timeline of English Poetry" Web page of the Representative Poetry Online Web site, University of Toronto

18th-century poetry
Poetry